Riva Ligure is a comune (municipality) in the Province of Imperia in the Italian region Liguria, located about  southwest of Genoa and about  southwest of Imperia.

Riva Ligure borders the following municipalities: Castellaro, Pompeiana, Santo Stefano al Mare, and Taggia.

Demographic evolution

References

External links
 www.comunedirivaligure.it/

Cities and towns in Liguria
Populated coastal places in Italy